Asbolus is a small genus of darkling beetles, beetles of the family Tenebrionidae. They occur in the southwestern United States and Mexico. There are four species:

Asbolus laevis LeConte, 1851
Asbolus mexicanus (Champion, 1884)
Asbolus papillosus (Triplehorn, 1964)
Asbolus verrucosus (LeConte, 1851)

References

Tenebrionidae
Beetles of North America